Fires of Eden may refer to:
 Fires of Eden (novel), a 1994 novel by Dan Simmons
 Fires of Eden (album), a 1990 album by Judy Collins